La Paura fa 90 is a 1951 Italian comedy film directed by Giorgio Simonelli.

Cast
 Silvana Pampanini: Luisa 
 Ugo Tognazzi: Anastasio/Duca Di Boffignac 
 Franca Marzi: Nanda 
 Carlo Croccolo: Pinotto 
 Virgilio Riento: Bargilio 
 Galeazzo Benti: Carlo Champignon 
 Luigi Pavese: Impresario 
 Anna Maria Bottini: Gipsy  
 Mario Castellani: Avvocato Lefevre  
 Alfredo Rizzo: Suggeritore

External links
 

1951 films
1950s Italian-language films
Films directed by Giorgio Simonelli
Italian comedy films
1951 comedy films
Italian black-and-white films
1950s Italian films